Christopher R. Olean is a baseball coach and former pitcher, who is the current head baseball coach of the St. Thomas (MN) Tommies. He played college baseball at St. Thomas (MN) where he played for head coach Dennis Denning from 1996 to 1999 before playing professionally from 1999 to 2001.

Playing career
Olean attended Washburn High School, in Minneapolis, Minnesota and played college baseball at University of St. Thomas (Minnesota). He was named the MIAC Pitcher of the Year in 1999. He finished his career with the 2nd most strikeouts in Tommie history with 246. Olean was then drafted in the 17th round of the 1999 Major League Baseball draft by the Milwaukee Brewers. He began his professional career with the Ogden Raptors before moving to the Helena Brewers. For the 2000 season, Olean played for the Beloit Snappers. Olean joined the St. Paul Saints during the summer of 2001.

Coaching career
After serving as interim head coach for the 2010 season, Olean was named the permanent head coach of the Tommies on January 12, 2011. During their final season of playing Division III, Olean lead the Tommies to the College World Series, finishing as the runner-up. Olean will lead the Tommies into the Division I ranks as St. Thomas joins the Summit League for the 2022 season.

Head coaching record

References

External links

St. Thomas Tommies bio

1977 births
Living people
Baseball players from Minnesota
Beloit Snappers players
Helena Brewers players
St. Paul Saints players
St. Thomas (Minnesota) Tommies baseball coaches
St. Thomas (Minnesota) Tommies baseball players
Ogden Raptors players
Baseball coaches from Minnesota